Henry Stanley may refer to:

Henry Stanley, 4th Earl of Derby (1531–1593), Lord High Steward at the trial for treason of Philip Howard, Earl of Arundel
Henry Stanley, 3rd Baron Stanley of Alderley (1827–1903), historian
Henry Morton Stanley (1841–1904), journalist and leading figure in the exploration of Africa
Henry Stanley (cricketer) (1873–1900), English cricketer
Henry Charles Stanley (1840–1921), chief engineer of the railways in Queensland, Australia
Henry Stanley (1515–1598), father of Sir Edward Stanley, 1st Baronet
Henry Smith-Stanley (1803–1875), British MP for Preston

See also 
Harry Stanley (disambiguation)
Stanley (disambiguation)